The Order of Air Merit is an honour awarded to members of the Dominican Air Force. It was established on 3 August 1952.

The Order is in three divisions:
Awarded for combat or war service. Displayed on a red ribbon
Awarded for long and faithful service. Displayed on a  blue ribbon
Awarded for other service. Displayed on a  white ribbon

Within each division, the award is made in one of four classes:

 First Class: to General Officers.
 Second Class: to Superior Officers.
 Third Class: to Junior Officers.
 Fourth Class: to Non-Commissioned Officers.

The motto of the order is Courage and Loyalty.

Post-Nominal
The person awarded with this honour should be added the post-nominal M. A. (Mérito Aéreo, Spanish for Air Merit) after his or her full name, in all the official papers and documents.

References

See also
 Orders, decorations, and medals of the Dominican Republic

Air Merit, Order of
Air Merit, Order of